Houguan may refer to:

Guan (instrument), a Chinese double reed wind instrument
Houguan, Hebei (侯贯), a town in Wei County, Xingtai, Hebei, China
Houguan county (侯官), a former county near Fuzhou, Fujian, China